Chowplu (also Romanized as Chowplū; also known as Choplī and Choplū) is a village in Saruq Rural District of Takht-e Soleyman District of Takab County, West Azerbaijan province, Iran. At the 2006 National Census, its population was 1,871 in 368 households. The following census in 2011 counted 1,958 people in 480 households. The latest census in 2016 showed a population of 1,788 people in 492 households; it was the largest village in its rural district.

References 

Takab County

Populated places in West Azerbaijan Province

Populated places in Takab County